Jean-Louis Schoellkopf (born 1946) is a French photographer.

Work
Schoellkopf's work explores the problems that cities face with economic change, which have led to new arrangements of urban spaces, creating new ways of thinking and of living within the city that cause conflicts.

Schoellkopf tries to shed light on these issues, in France and across Europe, according to historical, geographical and sociological perspectives.

Exhibition
Schoellkopf has exhibited at the Barcelona Museum of Contemporary Art, also known as MACBA, his 1987 photos of different families with different furnishings, living in identical Corbusier apartments in Firminy, France.

References

External links

1946 births
Living people
French contemporary artists
French photographers